Amédée Joullin  (3 June 1862, in San Francisco – 3 February 1917, in San Francisco) was a French American painter whose work centered on the landscapes of California and on Native Americans.

Biography
He was born in San Francisco to French parents. He studied painting at the San Francisco Art Institute and then with the painter Jules Tavernier. In 1884, while in Paris, he became impoverished. After returning to the United States in 1886, he was named a professor of painting and design at the San Francisco School of Design, where he stayed for ten years. From 1892 on, he specialized in Amerindian motifs and traveled to Mexico and New Mexico to paint.

He created the painting called Driving The Golden Spike on the southern arch of the rotunda of the Montana State Capitol. For his services, he was paid a sum of $500.

From 1900 through 1905, he studied at the École des Beaux-Arts de Paris and attended the Académie Julian. On May 25, 1907, he married the artist Lucille Wilcox in New York. He died at his home in San Francisco.  His works were collected by several museums in the United States, including the De Young Museum of San Francisco, and the  Crocker Art Museum in Sacramento.

Exhibitions
 Trans-Mississippi and international exposition. Omaha. 1898.
 First Annual Painters Salon. San Francisco. 1901.
 Union League Club. New York. 1901.
 South Carolina Interstate Exposition. Charleston. 1902.
 Helgesen gallery. San Francisco. 1910.
 Panama-Pacific International Exposition. San Francisco. 1915.
 Palace of Fine Arts. San Francisco. 1916.
 M.H. de Young Memorial Museum of San Francisco.

Museum collections
 Ball State University Museum of Art. Muncie.
 Oakland Museum of California. Oakland.

Notes

References
 Gene Hailey, California art research, Volumes 4 à 6. California Art Research Project. 1937.
 Kirby Lambert,Patricia Burnham, Susan Near, Montana's State Capitol: The People's House. Montana Historical Society Press. 2002.
 Claudine Chalmers, French San Francisco. Arcadia Publishing. 2007. 
 David Karel, Dictionnaire des artistes de langue française en Amérique du Nord. Les Presses de l'Université Laval. 1992.

External links

More works by Joullin @ ArtNet
Amédée Joullin @ Askart

1862 births
1917 deaths
19th-century American painters
19th-century American male artists
20th-century American painters
Académie Julian alumni
American expatriates in France
American male painters
American people of French descent
Artists from San Francisco
New Mexico Territory
20th-century American male artists